Richard James McGrath (June 30, 1901 – October 23, 1965) was a professional football player in the early National Football League for the Brooklyn Lions. He also played professionally for the Waterbury Blues in 1925, prior to the club's entry into the NFL in 1926 as the Hartford Blues. He served the Blues, not only as the team's captain, but also as its coach. Prior to his professional career, McGrath played college football for the Holy Cross Crusaders

References
PFRA article about Pre NFL Hartford Blues

External links

1901 births
Holy Cross Crusaders football players
College of the Holy Cross alumni
Waterbury Blues players
Brooklyn Lions players
Players of American football from Massachusetts
People from Winthrop, Massachusetts
Hartford Blues coaches
1965 deaths